Luren Baylón Francis (born 14 August 1977) is a Peruvian volleyball player. She competed in the women's tournament at the 1996 Summer Olympics. She competed at the  1998 FIVB Volleyball Women's World Championship , 2006 FIVB Volleyball Women's World Championship, and 2011 FIVB World Grand Prix.

References

External links
 

1977 births
Living people
Peruvian women's volleyball players
Olympic volleyball players of Peru
Volleyball players at the 1996 Summer Olympics
Place of birth missing (living people)
20th-century Peruvian women